Eternity Inc. is an adventure published by Mayfair Games in 1986 for the superhero role-playing game (RPG) DC Heroes.

Plot summary
The player characters are members of the Los Angeles-based superhero team Infinity, Inc. They are called to the Page Museum when it is invaded by prehistoric animals, and find themselves pitted against Gorilla Grodd and some Neanderthal sorcerers.

Publication history
Mayfair Games first published the superhero RPG DC Heroes in 1985. The 32-page adventure Eternity Inc. was published the following year, written by Lawrence Schick, with interior art by DC Comics staff, Gideon and Jerry O'Malley, cartography by Jimmy Clouse, and cover art by Ed Hannigan, Denys Cowan, Bob Smith, and Bob LeRose.

Reception
Pete Tamlyn reviewed Eternity Inc. for White Dwarf #84, and stated that "the plot is not in any way dependant on the nature of the heroes. It could be run for anyone, which is another useful aspect. Recommended."

References

DC Heroes adventures
Role-playing game supplements introduced in 1986